The 1975 Miami Dolphins season was the team's tenth, and sixth in the National Football League (NFL).  Although they tied for the division title at 10–4 with the Baltimore Colts, the Colts won the tiebreaker in 1975 with a sweep of both games. The sole wild card in the conference was Cincinnati at 11–3, so the Dolphins missed the playoffs for the first time since 1969.

The 1975 Dolphins were without running backs Larry Csonka and Jim Kiick and wide receiver Paul Warfield. They signed three-year contracts with the Memphis Southmen in March 1974 to play in the World Football League, beginning in 1975. The second-year league folded in the season's twelfth week, and the trio returned to the NFL in 1976 with other teams.

Offseason

NFL Draft

Personnel

Staff

Roster

Regular season

Schedule

Standings

References

External links
 1975 Miami Dolphins at Pro-Football-Reference.com

Miami
Miami Dolphins seasons
Miami Dolphins